Paul John Pickworth (born 22 September 1958) is an English cricketer.  Pickworth was a left-handed batsman.  He was born in Corbridge, Northumberland.

Pickworth made his debut for Northumberland in the 1981 Minor Counties Championship against Lincolnshire.  Pickowrth played Minor counties cricket for Northumberland from 1981 to 1984, which included 10 Minor Counties Championship matches and 3 MCCA Knockout Trophy matches.  He made his only List A appearance against Middlesex in the 1984 NatWest Trophy.  In this match, he scored 5 runs before being dismissed by John Emburey.

References

External links
Paul Pickworth at ESPNcricinfo
Paul Pickworth at CricketArchive

1958 births
Living people
People from Corbridge
Cricketers from Northumberland
English cricketers
Northumberland cricketers